Brittany Morgan Dengler (born September 24, 1987) is an American actress.

Early life
Morgan was born and raised in the Marlton section of Evesham Township, New Jersey, where she was a 2005 graduate of Cherokee High School.

Career

Morgan's first major recurring role was in 2008, as Lacey Thornfield on ABC Family's science-fiction comedy-drama series The Middleman. She was listed as one of Nylon magazine’s "55 Faces of the Future" in their Young Hollywood issue in May 2010.

From 2010 to 2011, she appeared as Debbie Pelt in HBO's vampire drama series True Blood. In an interview with TV Guide, Morgan described her character Debbie as "a really kick-ass, passionate, ballsy woman." In 2012, she appeared in four films: Cheesecake Casserole, She Wants Me, The Frozen and Freeloaders. She played Emma in the thriller film The Frozen, which followed a couple (Morgan and Seth David Mitchell), who end up stranded in freezing cold after a snowmobile accident.

Morgan had a supporting role in the thriller film Friend Request (2016) as Olivia Mathison, a best friend to a college student being stalked by a supernatural creature on social media. The film was shot in South Africa. Starting with the second-season premiere, Morgan has recurred as Penny Peabody on The CW's supernatural drama series Riverdale.

Filmography

Film

Television

Music videos

References

External links
 

1987 births
Living people
21st-century American actresses
Actresses from New Jersey
American film actresses
American television actresses
Cherokee High School (New Jersey) alumni
People from Evesham Township, New Jersey